Chaya Chobi is a unreleased Dhallywood romantic film directed by Mohammad Mostafa Kamal Raz and produced by Nine Entertainment. The film stars Arifin Shuvoo and Purnima in lead roles. The music was composed by Arfin Rumey.

Cast
 Arifin Shuvoo
 Purnima
 Rumel
 Dr.Ezazul Islam
 Shamima Nazneen
 G.M. Shahidul Alam

Soundtrack

References

Further reading

External links
 

Bengali-language Bangladeshi films
Bangladeshi romance films
Films scored by Arfin Rumey
Unreleased Bangladeshi films